Cornelius Delaney, formerly known as Nique Needles, is an Australian artist, musician and actor. He currently lives in France where he continues to produce and exhibit paintings, and perform with his group Darky Valetta.

Music
In 1981 Needles formed Melbourne band The Curse along with John Rowell, Graeme Scott (both from Models), Nick Barker and Adrian Chynoweth. Needles later went on to front Freak Power with Scott, Barker and Chynoweth. In 1987 Freak Power released a self-titled album through Rampant Releases. In 1992 Freak Power was re-formed with Needles, Chynoweth, Barker, Stu Thomas, and Peter Jones (drummer). Jones left the band mid 1994 to join Crowded House to complete their USA tour.

In the early '90s, Doghouse followed in the wake of Freak Power; the initial lineup being Needles, Chynoweth, Thomas, Delaney Davidson and David Sanford. The final lineup was Needles, Thomas, Davidson, and Mark Di Marzio.

In 2003 he formed Box Monsters, with whom he played regularly around the Northern Rivers region of NSW until they disbanded in 2006.

Recently (as Cornelius Delaney) in between exhibitions of his paintings, he has been singing, playing guitar and writing for his band Darky Valetta formed in France in 2018.

Acting
Needles' first acting role was playing the character Aspro in The Kid written by Michael Gow, performed at The Nimrod Theatre in Sydney in 1983.  He went on to play Graham Cummerford with Jason Connery in the film The Boy Who Had Everything, for which he won the 1985 AFI Award for Best Actor in a Supporting Role. He appeared in the film Bliss (1985 film) and played the character Tim alongside Michael Hutchence in the 1986 film Dogs in Space about the early '80s punk scene in Melbourne.  He co-starred with Jo Kennedy as Rex in Tender Hooks in 1987, and in 1988 played Australian athlete John Landy in The Four Minute Mile. For his work on As Time Goes By (1988 film) - aka "L'Australieno" - he received the award for Best Actor in A Science-Fiction Film at the 1988 Fantafestival in Italy.

He was in the film Smoke 'Em If You Got 'Em.

In 1988, following an extended period of almost back to back film work, Needles went to India where he wandered alone for several months.

One of his last acting roles was playing Darren Mack in the 1994 TV mini-series Janus.

In 2000 (resuming his birth name Cornelius Delaney) he enrolled at university and in 2008 completed a PhD in Visual Art.  Since then he has focussed on his painting practice and making music.

References

External links
 
Biographical cuttings on Nique Needles, actor, containing one or more cuttings from newspapers or journals at the National Library of Australia

Australian male film actors
Australian male television actors
Living people
Year of birth missing (living people)